Neurankylus is an extinct genus of turtles in the family Baenidae that lived between 112 and 61 million years ago in Canada and the United States. It was originally placed within the monotypic family Neurankylidae, but it has since been placed in the Neurankylinae, alongside Trinitichelys. The type species, Neurankylus eximius, was described by Lawrence Lambe in 1902. The species N. lithographicus was discovered in the Milk River Formation (Canada), alongside the holotype of the pachycephalosaurid dinosaur Acrotholus audeti.

References

Baenidae
Cretaceous turtles
Paleocene turtles
Cretaceous reptiles of North America
Paleocene reptiles of North America
Hell Creek fauna
Fossil taxa described in 1902
Taxa named by Lawrence Lambe